John Dennehy (born 22 March 1940) is a former Irish Fianna Fáil politician. He was a Teachta Dála (TD) for the Cork South-Central constituency.

Early life 
Dennehy was educated at Sharman Crawford Technical Institute and Cork College of Commerce. A fitter by trade, Dennehy spent most of his working life with Irish Steel in Haulbowline until he went full-time into politics.

Career 
Dennehy was elected to Cork City Council for the South–West area in 1974 and subsequently re-elected at every election until he resigned from the council in 2003 due to the dual mandate rule. He was Lord Mayor of Cork from 1983 to 1984.

He stood unsuccessfully at the 1977 general election for the Cork Mid constituency, and in 1979 he was narrowly defeated in a by-election for the Cork City constituency by Fine Gael's Liam Burke in one of a string of by-election defeats for the Fianna Fáil government.

Dennehy was first elected to Dáil Éireann at the 1987 general election but lost his seat to party colleague Batt O'Keeffe at the 1992 general election. He regained his seat at the 1997 general election and narrowly held it by 6 votes against a challenge from Kathy Sinnott at the 2002 general election. He lost his seat at the 2007 general election.

References

 

1940 births
Living people
Fianna Fáil TDs
Local councillors in Cork (city)
Lord Mayors of Cork
Members of the 25th Dáil
Members of the 26th Dáil
Members of the 28th Dáil
Members of the 29th Dáil